Vojvoda Stepa is a village in Serbia. It is situated in the Nova Crnja municipality, in the Central Banat District, Vojvodina province. The population of the village numbering 1,720 people (2002 census), of whom majority are ethnic Serbs.

Name

In Serbian, the village is known as Vojvoda Stepa (Војвода Степа), and in Hungarian as Leónamajor. It is named after First World War in vojvoda Stepa Stepanović, one of four famous Dukes during the 1st World War, when couple of locals came to Čačak, when Duke was living and asked him for permission.

History

The village was founded in 1923 and was settled by colonists who originated from various parts of the Kingdom of Serbs, Croats and Slovenes (Montenegro, Herzegovina, Lika, etc.). Many of the colonists were soldiers of the Serbian army, under the command of Vojvoda Stepa Stepanović, after whom the village gets its name. First name of the village was Leonovac (Леоновац), named after the daughter of Count Csekonics who had estate in the area where the village was founded.

Ethnic groups (2002 census)

Serbs = 1,584 (92.09%)
Montenegrins = 41 (2.38%)
Romani = 32 (1.86%)
Yugoslavs = 12 (0.70%)
Croats = 11 (0.64%)
others.

Historical population

1948: 2,832
1953: 3,076
1961: 2,857
1971: 2,518
1981: 2,032
1991: 1,827
2002: 1,720
2011: 1,412

Culture

Coat of arms

The Coat of arms of Vojvoda Stepa was adopted on August 6, 2003. The Coat of arms was designed by Rade Pavlović and Nenad Jovanović. It depicts Basil of Ostrog holding the flag of Banat, and Stepa Stepanović holding a regimental flag of the Army of the Kingdom of Serbia.

See also
List of places in Serbia
List of cities, towns and villages in Vojvodina

References
Slobodan Ćurčić, Broj stanovnika Vojvodine, Novi Sad, 1996.

External links 

 Municipalities of Vojvodina

Populated places in Serbian Banat